The State Ministry of Higher Education is a Non-cabinet ministry of the Government of Sri Lanka responsible for formulating and implementing national policy on higher education and other subjects which come under its purview. Broadly, this involves the maintenance, expansion, standardisation and general oversight and regulation of higher education institutions in the country.

The current State Minister of Higher Education is vacant.

Ministers

Parties

Secretaries

See also
 Education in Sri Lanka
 Expressways of Sri Lanka
 Higher education in Sri Lanka
 List of A-Grade highways in Sri Lanka
 List of Universities in Sri Lanka

References

External links
 Official website of the Ministry of Higher Education, Technology and Innovation

Higher Education, Technology and Innovation
Sri Lanka
 
Higher Education, Technology and Innovation